Bonga is a surname and a given name. Notable people with the name include:

 Bonga (musician) (born 1942), Angolan singer-songwriter
 George Bonga (1802–1880), Indian fur trader
 Isaac Bonga (born 1999), German basketball player
 Jan Bonga (born 1964), Swiss windsurfer
 Paul Bonga Bonga (born 1933), Congolese footballer
 Pierre Bonga (1770s–1831), trapper and interpreter
 Tarsis Bonga (born 1997), German-Congolese footballer
 Bonga Makaka (born 2000), South African cricketer
 Bonga Perkins (born 1972), American surfer